Stefan Riederer (born December 26, 1985) is a German footballer who played in the 3. Liga.

External links

1985 births
Living people
German footballers
SpVgg Unterhaching players
1. FC Kaiserslautern II players
Chemnitzer FC players
3. Liga players
Association football goalkeepers
People from Cham, Germany
Sportspeople from the Upper Palatinate
Footballers from Bavaria